The 1987 Aragonese regional election was held on Wednesday, 10 June 1987, to elect the 2nd Cortes of the autonomous community of Aragon. All 67 seats in the Cortes were up for election. The election was held simultaneously with regional elections in 12 other autonomous communities and local elections all throughout Spain, as well as the 1987 European Parliament election.

Affected by their national trends, the Spanish Socialist Workers' Party (PSOE) and the People's Alliance (AP) lost support compared to the previous election, falling from 46.8% and 22.6% to 35.7% and 15.5%, and from 33 and 18 seats to 27 and 13, respectively. The latter had suffered from an internal crisis and the breakup of the People's Coalition in 1986, losing 30% of its 1983 vote and finishing third as a result, with the Regionalist Aragonese Party (PAR) scoring a strong second place with 28.1% and 19 seats. The centrist Democratic and Social Centre (CDS), a party led by the former Spanish prime minister Adolfo Suarez, saw sizeable gains and achieved a kingmaker position with 10.2% and 6 seats. United Left (IU) made a small advance of 0.9 percentage points and 1 seat, but was not able to capitalize on the PSOE's losses.

The two main centre-right parties, the PAR and AP, were able to muster 32 seats in the Cortes compared to the PSOE's 27. As a result, PAR leader Hipólito Gómez de las Roces was elected as new president of Aragon, replacing Santiago Marraco at the helm of a minority administration with AP's support and the CDS's abstention. In March 1989, AP, now refounded as the People's Party (PP), entered the government and formed a coalition with the PAR for the remainder of the legislature.

Overview

Electoral system
The Cortes of Aragon were the devolved, unicameral legislature of the autonomous community of Aragon, having legislative power in regional matters as defined by the Spanish Constitution and the Aragonese Statute of Autonomy, as well as the ability to vote confidence in or withdraw it from a regional president.

Voting for the Cortes was on the basis of universal suffrage, which comprised all nationals over 18 years of age, registered in Aragon and in full enjoyment of their political rights. The 67 members of the Cortes of Aragon were elected using the D'Hondt method and a closed list proportional representation, with an electoral threshold of three percent of valid votes—which included blank ballots—being applied in each constituency. Seats were allocated to constituencies, corresponding to the provinces of Huesca, Teruel and Zaragoza, with each being allocated an initial minimum of 13 seats and the remaining 28 being distributed in proportion to their populations (provided that the seat-to-population ratio in the most populated province did not exceed 2.75 times that of the least populated one).

The use of the D'Hondt method might result in a higher effective threshold, depending on the district magnitude.

Election date
The term of the Cortes of Aragon expired four years after the date of their previous election. The election decree was required to be issued no later than the twenty-fifth day prior to the date of expiry of parliament and published on the following day in the Official Gazette of Aragon (BOA), with election day taking place between the fifty-fourth and the sixtieth day from publication. The previous election was held on 8 May 1983, which meant that the legislature's term would have expired on 8 May 1987. The election decree was required to be published in the BOA no later than 14 April 1987, with the election taking place no later than the sixtieth day from publication, setting the latest possible election date for the Cortes on Saturday, 13 June 1987.

The Cortes of Aragon could not be dissolved before the date of expiry of parliament except in the event of an investiture process failing to elect a regional president within a two-month period from the first ballot. In such a case, the Cortes were to be automatically dissolved and a snap election called, with elected deputies merely serving out what remained of their four-year terms.

Parties and candidates
The electoral law allowed for parties and federations registered in the interior ministry, coalitions and groupings of electors to present lists of candidates. Parties and federations intending to form a coalition ahead of an election were required to inform the relevant Electoral Commission within ten days of the election call, whereas groupings of electors needed to secure the signature of at least one percent of the electorate in the constituencies for which they sought election, disallowing electors from signing for more than one list of candidates.

Below is a list of the main parties and electoral alliances which contested the election:

Opinion polls
The table below lists voting intention estimates in reverse chronological order, showing the most recent first and using the dates when the survey fieldwork was done, as opposed to the date of publication. Where the fieldwork dates are unknown, the date of publication is given instead. The highest percentage figure in each polling survey is displayed with its background shaded in the leading party's colour. If a tie ensues, this is applied to the figures with the highest percentages. The "Lead" column on the right shows the percentage-point difference between the parties with the highest percentages in a poll. When available, seat projections determined by the polling organisations are displayed below (or in place of) the percentages in a smaller font; 34 seats were required for an absolute majority in the Cortes of Aragon.

Results

Overall

Distribution by constituency

Aftermath

Notes

References
Opinion poll sources

Other

1987 in Aragon
Aragon
Regional elections in Aragon
June 1987 events in Europe